Alvin Schwartz (April 25, 1927 – March 14, 1992) was an American author and journalist who wrote more than fifty books dedicated to and dealing with topics such as folklore and word play, many of which were intended for young readers.

Life and career 
Schwartz was born in life the son of Gussie and Harry Schwartz, a taxi driver. After a stint in the navy, Schwartz became interested in writing. He received his bachelor's degree from Colby College and a master's degree in journalism from Northwestern University. He reported for The Binghamton Press from 1951 to 1955. During his professional writing career his work had been published by a variety of firms, including Lippincott, Bantam Books, Farrar Straus, and HarperCollins.

A series of his books on folklore for children were illustrated by Glen Rounds and each featured a type of folklore: the first, A Twister of Twists, a Tangler of Tongues, was published in 1972. Others in this series included Tomfoolery, which featured wordplay; Witcracks which was about smart-aleck riddles and jokes; and Cross Your Fingers, Spit in Your Hat, about superstitions.

He is best known for the Scary Stories to Tell in the Dark series, which featured gruesome, nightmarish illustrations by Stephen Gammell. The series was America's most frequently challenged book (or book series) for library inclusion of 1990-1999.

Some of his other books, such as When I Grew Up Long Ago, were aimed at an older audience, and presented glimpses of life in the United States during the late 19th century and the early 20th century.

Schwartz died of lymphoma in Princeton, New Jersey on March 14, 1992, six weeks before his 65th birthday. Schwartz was survived by his wife and four children.

The Scary Stories series 

 Scary Stories to Tell in the Dark
 More Scary Stories to Tell in the Dark
 Scary Stories 3 : More Tales to Chill Your Bones

Other books 
  In A Dark, Dark Room and Other Scary Stories 
 Ghosts!: Ghostly Tales from Folklore
 Stories to Tell a Cat
 And the Green Grass Grew All around: Folk Poetry from Everyone
 Gold and Silver, Silver and Gold: Tales of Hidden Treasure
 I Saw You in the Bathtub and Other Folk Rhymes
 Telling Fortunes: Love Magic, Dream Signs, and Other Ways to Learn the Future
 Tales of Trickery from the Land of Spoof
 All of Our Noses Are Here and Other Noodle Tales
 Cat's Elbow and Other Secret Languages
 Ten Copycats in a Boat and Other Riddles
 Fat Man in a Fur Coat: And Other Bear Stories
 Unriddling: All Sorts of Riddles to Puzzle Your Guessary
 Busy Buzzing Bumblebees and Other Tongue Twisters
 There Is a Carrot in My Ear and Other Noodle Tales
 Flapdoodle: Pure Nonsense from American Folklore
 Chin Music: Tall Talk and Other Talk
 When I Grew Up Long Ago
 Kickle Sniffers and Other Fearsome Critters
 Witcracks: Jokes and Jests from American Folklore
 Whoppers: Tall Tales and Other Lies Collected from American Folklore
 Cross Your Fingers, Spit in Your Hat: Superstitions and Other Beliefs
 "A Twister of Twists, A Tangler of Tongues"
 "More Scary Stories To Tell In The Dark"

Compilations 
 Scary Stories to Read When It's Dark (Reading Rainbow Readers series)

References

External links 
 New York Times obituary
 

1927 births
1992 deaths
American children's writers
American horror writers
Deaths from lymphoma
Colby College alumni
Ghost story writers
Medill School of Journalism alumni
Northwestern University alumni